Bazzini, also known as the A. L. Bazzini Company, and Bazzini Brothers, is a nut, fruit, and chocolate company headquartered in Allentown, Pennsylvania. Founded in New York City in 1886, it is the oldest nut company in the United States. From its beginning until 1968, it was based on Park Place in the Washington Market neighborhood, part of what is now Tribeca. It moved to a large nut processing facility on Greenwich Street until 1997, when it moved to the Bronx, and later to Allentown.

History
Anthony L. Bazzini, an Italian immigrant, started the company in 1886, selling nuts to businesses and individuals. It was based on Park Place until 1968, when the Washington Market was demolished amid urban renewal programs. Most other food wholesalers moved up to The Bronx, but Bazzini already owned a six-story brick building at nearby 339 Greenwich Street, so they relocated operations there.

As of 1976, the company processed 3,000 tons of peanuts out of the New York facility. The nuts came from Virginia, North Carolina, and Georgia to be roasted in the shell or shelled, blanched, and either oil or dry-roasted. It also processed Brazil nuts, cashews, pine nuts, pumpkin seeds, walnuts, and pecans.

The company has had arrangements with large venues in New York, like the Madison Square Garden, Shea Stadium, and Yankee Stadium. It has supplied Yankee Stadium since it opened in 1923, and continues to do so as of 2017. It also distributed to a number of retail shops like Zabar's.

The New York Times wrote an article about how Bazzini benefitted from Jimmy Carter's association with peanuts, and called it "one of the largest packers and distributors of nuts in America".

Rocco Damato and partners bought the company from the Bazzini family in 1983. In the 1980s, due to the increased expense of operating in Manhattan, the company sold some space in the Greenwich Street building to condominium developers, but retained the retail space on the first floor. Rocco and Electra Damato operated the nut store which had been there since the company moved in, but expanded it to include gourmet food and a cafe. They transferred some production to North Carolina before deciding to completely relocate. In 1997, Bazzini relocateded its main nut processing facility from Tribeca to Hunts Point in the Bronx, leaving the retail store behind on Greenwich Street. It was one of the last food companies left in a neighborhood that had been known for wholesale food manufacturing.

In 2011, it acquired Barton's Candy Company a Chocolatier and candy company founded in 1940.  That same year Bazizini's factory moved again, this time to Allentown, Pennsylvania. Damato attributed the decision to the passage of the Food Safety Modernization Act, a law which gives the Food and Drug Administration (FDA) new authorities to regulate the way foods are grown, harvested and processed. He said it would require tens of millions of dollars in upgrades to the Bronx facility to come up to code. They opted to move to Allentown because it already owned a more modern facility there after its purchase of Barton's. After the move, it retained offices and distribution in New York City.

The company's trademark is a happy elephant holding a big peanut. As of 2017, it is the oldest nut company in the United States.

Bazzini Building

The large nut processing building which operated at 339 Greenwich Street, at the intersection with Jay Street, is still known as the Bazzini Building.

It was initially built for John H. Mohlmann, who owned a successful grocery business which operated in the Washington Market neighborhood and purchased several buildings in the area. After he died, his estate combined four lots to construct a large, six-story building. It was designed by C. Wilson Atkins in Renaissance and Romanesque Revival styles. The Greenwich Street side is slightly taller, but the Jay Street facade has larger arches.

The Mohlmann family operated a wholesale grocery out of part of the space, while other businesses leased the rest. A large number of businesses, mostly food wholesalers, operated out of the building in the first half of the 20th century. Bazzini purchased it, along with adjacent buildings, in 1943, even while maintaining their business operations in Park Place and continuing to rent out to others. When their business was forced out of Park Place, they moved to Greenwich Street.

Though Bazzini left Tribeca in 1997, the large nut processing building remains, converted into condominiums. It is part of the Tribeca West Historic District, designated May 7, 1991. The Damatos' retail store in the former Bazzini building closed in 2010.

References

:Category:Chocolatiers

1886 establishments in New York (state)
Companies based in Allentown, Pennsylvania
Edible nuts and seeds
Food and drink companies established in 1886
Snack food manufacturers of Pennsylvania
Tribeca